Michael Begler is an American television writer, producer and screenwriter. He is best known for co-creating Cinemax's period medical drama The Knick, and for writing the films Raising Helen (2004), The Shaggy Dog (2006) and Big Miracle (2012), all with writing partner Jack Amiel.

Early life 
Begler was born and raised in Long Island, New York. He attended the University of Wisconsin-Madison, where he majored in English.

He met his future writing partner Jack Amiel while they were in college together and both entered the university's musical-comedy contest, 'Humorology'.

Career 
After college, Begler moved to New York and worked as a PA on The Cosby Show. He and Amiel, who was working as a PA in Los Angeles, decided to write together shortly after, and Begler soon joined Amiel in Los Angeles. Their first writing job was on Fox's Herman's Head.

Begler worked consistently from that point onwards, writing - with Amiel - on a number of sitcoms, including Empty Nest, Minor Adjustments, The Jeff Foxworthy Show, The Tony Danza Show and Malcolm in the Middle.

In the mid-2000s, Begler transitioned into writing feature films, penning the scripts for the romantic comedies The Prince and Me and Garry Marshall's Raising Helen, both released in 2004. In 2006, Begler wrote Disney's The Shaggy Dog, starring Tim Allen and Robert Downey Jr.

Begler wrote 2012's Ken Kwapis-directed Big Miracle starring Drew Barrymore. Cinemax picked up Begler and Amiel's The Knick to series, after they wrote the pilot script on spec. Steven Soderbergh came on board the series as director and executive producer. Begler and Amiel served as co-showrunners and executive producers, and wrote the majority of the series' episodes. The series premiered on August 8, 2014. It was renewed for a second season of 10 episodes, airing October 2015. In April 2021, it was announced that Bagler and Amiel will serve as an executive producers and showrunners for second season of Perry Mason. Around the same time, he signed an overall deal with HBO.

Filmography 
Films

Production staff

Writer

References

External links 
 

Living people
People from Long Island
American male screenwriters
Year of birth missing (living people)
Film producers from New York (state)
University of Wisconsin–Madison College of Letters and Science alumni
Writers from New York City
Screenwriters from New York (state)
American male television writers
American television writers